Fulton Township is a township in Muscatine County, Iowa, in the United States.

History
Fulton Township was organized on March 4, 1857.

References

Townships in Muscatine County, Iowa
Townships in Iowa
1857 establishments in Iowa
Populated places established in 1857